The 2022 European Space Agency Astronaut Group is the latest class of the European Astronaut Corps. The selection recruited five "career" astronauts, 11 "reserve" and one "astronaut with a physical disability". It is the fourth European Space Agency (ESA) recruitment campaign and the first since 2008 and over 22 thousand applications were received. 

The selected corps joined the continuing corps of ESA astronauts, those selected in 2009, to perform long-duration spaceflight missions aboard the International Space Station, and "...will form part of the crew for the next missions to the moon in the late 2020s and through the 2030s" – as part of the Artemis program.

Group members 

The announcement of the selected candidates took place in Paris on November 23 at the Grand Palais Éphémère, at the conclusion of the 2022 ESA Ministerial Council meeting.

Along with the five selected "career astronauts", the campaign recruited a "reserve pool" of astronauts who "...will not be permanent ESA staff, but could have the opportunity to be selected for specific projects, as project astronauts." The campaign also recruited people with a physical disability through the "parastronaut feasibility project" with the intention, but not guarantee, of spaceflight.

Parastronaut
 John McFall  Orthopaedic surgeon
Reserves

Recruitment 

The recruitment campaign was announced at press conferences in February 2021. Applications for the roles of "astronaut" and "astronaut (with a physical disability)" in the ESA Directorate of Human and Robotic Exploration Programmes were accepted between 31 March and 18 June of that year. The original deadline of May 28 was extended by three weeks due to Lithuania joining ESA as an associate-member of ESA, and its citizens therefore becoming eligible to apply, only a week before the original deadline.

Criteria 
Recruits could be a citizen of any ESA member or associate-member state. Women were particularly encouraged to apply — in order to address the gender gap among astronauts — as under 16% of applicants in the previous recruitment campaign were women. 

The minimum formal criteria included: being a citizen of an ESA member (or associate member) state under the age of 50; being between 150 and 190cm tall (with possible exception under the parastronaut category); a "normal weight" BMI range; fluency in English and another language; a master's degree in the Natural Sciences, Medicine, Engineering, Mathematics/Computer Sciences (plus three years of professional experience), or accreditation as an experimental test pilot; a "hearing capacity of 25 dB or better per ear"; and a current class 2 pilot's medical certificate. Upon selection, recruits would then receive training in "...the essentials of being an astronaut, survival skills and the Russian language, before moving on to robotics, navigation, maintenance and spacewalks", and then receiving mission-specific training.

The types of disability considered for parastronaut program are lower limb deficiency (e.g. due to amputation or congenital limb deficiency), leg length difference, or short stature.

Applicants 
Applications from 22,523 candidates were received. They came from all eligible nationalities (including Lithuania), as well as 257 for the parastronaut program. This represented a 2.8x increase in the number of applications received compared to the previous ESA astronaut selection process. Almost five and a half thousand applicants (24%) were women – up from 1287 (15.3%) female applicants in the previous selection process. Estonia had the highest proportion of female applicants (38.6%), while Switzerland had the lowest (17.8%).

With over seven thousand applications the largest number of applicants were French citizens, almost twice as many as the next most common applicant citizenship, Germans. It was speculated that the popularity of the call for applicants among French citizens was due to Thomas Pesquet's "Alpha" mission to the ISS beginning while the application period was open. More than a thousand applications were also received from British, Spanish, Italian and Belgian citizens, while less than 100 applications were received from Estonians, Latvians, Lithuanians, Luxembourgers, and Slovenians. ESA stressed that the eventual selection is "irrespective" of national funding of the organisation.

Selection process 
The selection process itself proceeds over six stages:

 Screening of applicants was undertaken "on the basis of documents submitted, the application form and the screening questionnaire." It was initially expected that approximately 1500 (7%) applicants would be accepted through to stage 2. By the conclusion of the 1st stage in January 2022, 1361 astronaut candidates and 27 parastronaut candidates were invited to the 2nd stage – including at least one man and one woman from every eligible nationality.
 Initial tests consisted of "cognitive, technical, motor coordination and personality tests" administered by the German Aerospace Center in Hamburg.
 Assessment centre evaluation involved "additional psychometric tests, individual and group exercises and practical tests" administered at the European Astronaut Centre in Cologne. 
 Medical tests assessed "physical and psychological condition in view of long-duration astronaut missions" administered in Cologne and the Toulouse Space Centre, France.
 Panel interview assesses "technical and behavioural competencies" including a background check.
 Final interview with the ESA Director General at the agency headquarters in Paris.

See also 
 NASA Astronaut Group 23

Notes

References

External links 
 ESA recruitment website YourWayToSpace and astronaut application handbook

European Space Agency personnel
Lists of astronauts
Human spaceflight programs